Leïla Marouane (born in 1960) is a Tunisian-born French Algerian journalist and creative writer.  Leïla Marouane is a pseudonym; her full name is Leyla Zineb Mechentel. She is an author of novels and short fiction which have received a number of awards within the French-language literature community.

Biography 
Leyla Z. Mechentel was born in 1960 in Djerba, Tunisia, to a family living there in exile. The family moved to Biskra, and they lived there until she was six, when they moved to Algiers. She lived there until her exile from Algeria to Paris in 1991.

She became a journalist after her college studies were interrupted in Algiers, working for Horizons and El Watan. She later wrote for Politis and Jeune Afrique, as well as the German-language press. In 1995, she attended Paris 8 University to finish her schooling. There she completed a creative writing degree, under the novelist Paul Fournel. Her debut novel, La fille de la Casbah (in English The Daughter of the Kasbah) , was published by Éditions Julliard in 1996. Since, she has published a number of novels.  Her first novel translated or published in English was her 1998 Ravisseur, translated into English as "The Abductor".

She is also the founder of La Boutique (est. 1996), a creative writing focused organization which promotes French-language writing.

Literary works 
 1996 : La Fille de la casbah (novel, published by Julliard)
 1998 : Ravisseur ( in English, The Abductor  novel, published by Julliard)
 2001 : Le Châtiment des hypocrites (novel, published by Le Seuil)
 2003 : L'Algérie des deux rives  (Short story collection Fayard)
 2004 : Les Criquelins  ; suivi de Le sourire de la Joconde (novella, published by Fayard)
 2005 : La Jeune Fille et la Mère (novel, published by Le Seuil)
 2007 : La Vie sexuelle d'un islamiste à Paris (in English, The Sexual Life of an Islamist in Paris, novel, published by Albin Michel)
 2009 : Le Papier, l'encre et la braise (Sociological monograph)
 2009 : Nouvelles d'Algérie (short story collection, published by Magellan in octobre 2009)
 2012 : ALGERIES 50 (short collection by Éditions Magellan, 2012)

Awards 
 Jean-Claude Izzo Prize, 2006
 Prix des écrivains de langue française, 2006
 Prix Gironde, 2001
 Prix de la Société des gens de lettres, 2001
 Prix du roman français à New York, 2002
 Liberaturpreis, 2004
 Creator of Peace (Unesco), 2000
 Narrativa Donna, 2004

References

Sources 
 Zohra Bouchentouf-Siagh, Dzayer, Alger : ville portée, rêvée, imaginée, Casbah, 2006, p. 84–86
 Achour Cheurfi, Écrivains algériens : dictionnaire biographique, Casbah éditions, 2004, p. 249
 Pierre Grenaud, Algérie brillante d'hier, amère Algérie d'aujourd'hui, L'Harmattan, 2000, p. 60

See also 
 List of Algerian writers

1960 births
Living people
Algerian women writers
Algerian writers
French women novelists
Algerian journalists
Pseudonymous women writers
French women journalists
People from Djerba
University of Paris alumni
20th-century French novelists
20th-century French women writers
21st-century French novelists
21st-century French women writers
French women short story writers
20th-century French short story writers
21st-century French short story writers
Algerian women journalists
20th-century pseudonymous writers
21st-century pseudonymous writers
21st-century Algerian people